HD 201772, also known as HR 8104, is a yellowish-white hued star located in the southern constellation Microscopium. It has an apparent magnitude of 5.26, making it one of the brighter members of this generally faint constellation. At its current distance, HD 201772's brightness is diminished by 0.11 magnitudes due to interstellar dust.

The star has been given multiple stellar classifications over the years. It was given the luminosity class of a subgiant and main sequence star (IV/V; IV-V) and a dwarf (V). Most sources generally agree that it is a F5 star. Richard O. Gray and colleagues give HD 201772 a class of F6 V Fe−0.9 CH−0.5, which indicates that it is a F-type main-sequence star with an underabundance of iron and CH molecules in its spectrum.

At an age of 2.5 billion years, HD 201722 is currently 1.33 magnitudes above the ZAMS, consistent with a star that is evolving off the main sequence. The star has an iron abundance 66% that of the Sun, making it metal deficient.

However, the stars have no separation or an orbital period. This is because the companion might be a result of spectrum contamination, so HD 201772 is more likely to be  a solitary star.

References

F-type subgiants
F-type main-sequence stars
Microscopium
Microscopii, 56
CD-39 14152
201772
104738
8104
High-proper-motion stars